Enzo Pulcrano (born 31 May 1943 in Acerra, Italy, near Naples; died 28 February 1992) was an Italian actor and writer active in the 1970s and known for Rulers of the City (1976), La Banda Vallanzasca (1977) and A Pugni Nudi (1974), in which he received a writing credit. He was born on 31 May 1943 in Acerra, Italy, near Naples.

Biography

After his 1971 debut in director Demofilo Fidani’s A Fistful of Death, Pulcrano appeared in several mostly low-budget spaghetti Westerns and comedies. With the crime genre’s popularity, he was a recurring presence in poliziotteschi, including Fernando di Leo’s Rulers of the City (1976) and Mario Bianchi's La banda Vallanzasca (1977), in which he had the lead role.

He played Salvatore Trapanese in the 1976 comedy Hit Squad.

Death
Pulcrano died in 1992. According to Mario Bianchi, who directed him in La Banda Vallanzasca, Pulcrano had developed a serious drug addiction.

Filmography 
Giù le mani... carogna! (Django Story), directed by Demofilo Fidani (1970)
Il magnifico west, directed by Gianni Crea (1971)
Giù la testa... hombre!, directed by Demofilo Fidani (1971)
Rimase uno solo e fu la morte per tutti! (1971)
Black Killer, directed by Carlo Croccolo (1971)
I racconti di Canterbury N. 2, directed by Lucio Dandolo (1972)
Decameron n° 2 - Le altre novelle del Boccaccio, directed by Mino Guerrini (1972)
Decameron n° 4 - Le belle novelle del Boccaccio, directed by Paolo Bianchini (1972)
A.A.A. Massaggiatrice bella presenza offresi..., directed by Demofilo Fidani (1972)
Scansati... a Trinità arriva Eldorado, directed by Joe D'Amato (1972)
Un Bounty killer a Trinità (1972)
Le favolose notti d'oriente (1973)
Mafia Killer (1973)
Amico mio, frega tu... che frego io! (1973)
Novelle licenziose di vergini vogliose, directed by Joe D'Amato (1973)
La mafia mi fa un baffo, directed by Riccardo Garrone (1974)
A pugni nudi, regia di Marcello Zeani (1974)
Quant'è bella la Bernarda, tutta nera, tutta calda, directed by Lucio Dandolo (1975)
La commessa (1975)
La Bolognese, directed by Alfredo Rizzo (1975)
La città sconvolta: caccia spietata ai rapitori (1975)
Uomini si nasce poliziotti si muore (1976)
Squadra antifurto (1976)
I padroni della città (1976)
La banda Vallanzasca (1977)
Squadra antimafia (1977)
Assassinio sul Tevere (1979)
Cameriera senza malizia (1980)
Ricomincio da zero (1982)

References

External links
 

1943 births
1992 deaths
20th-century Italian male actors
Italian male film actors